"Hole in My Heart (All the Way to China)" is a song recorded by American singer and songwriter Cyndi Lauper for her 1988 film Vibes. It was written by Richard Orange, formerly of the band Zuider Zee. The track saw the light of day on an official CD, as of 2003, with the release of the 3-CD compilation, The Great Cyndi Lauper. It can be found on the following albums: Best Movie Album in the World...Ever! (3 CDs), True Colors: The Best of Cyndi Lauper (2 CDs), 36 All-time Favorites (3 CDs), Monster Hits 1988/Hits of 1988 and Cyndi Lauper Japanese Singles Collection Greatest Hits (audio track on CD and music video on DVD).

Song information
During a live concert and Q&A appearance in Las Vegas,  Cyndi stated her record company thought the song was too fast for radio. Lauper seldom performed this in concert.  As part of the "A Night To Remember" tour, she was included in the set list of the Santiago de Chile show in November 1989. 

In 2004, during the Australian leg of her "At Last" tour, she performed part of the song a cappella at the request of the audience, since the single reached the Top 10 there in 1988 and was very well known.  However, it wasn't until the 2006 Body Acoustic Tour that she played the song regularly in full again, and she frequently opened the True Colors 2007 Tour with it. The song was also the opening track of her 2008 Australian Tour.

Composition
It was written by Richard Orange. The song length is 4 minutes and 2 seconds. It was written in the key of E major with 105 beats per minute.

Critical reception
Pan-European magazine Music & Media wrote, "Nervous, up-tempo pop song with an incredibly speedy, Westworld-like R&R feel. Try to dance to it."

Cash Box called it "an instant classic," saying that Lauper "delivers an emotional, yet energy-up vocal that works."

Track listings

US, 7" Vinyl single
"Hole in My Heart (All the Way to China)" — 3:57 
"Boy Blue" (Live at Le Zénith) — 5:36

UK, CD single
"Hole in My Heart (All the Way to China)" — 3:53 
"Boy Blue" (Live at Le Zénith) — 5:36
"Time After Time" — 3:59 	
"What's Going On" (Shep Pettibone Club Mix) — 6:27

Japan, Europe, CD Mini single
"Hole in My Heart (All the Way to China)" — 4:02
"Boy Blue" (Live at Le Zénith) — 5:39
"Maybe He'll Know" (Remix) — 3:42

US, UK, Cassette single
"Hole in My Heart (All the Way to China)" — 3:57
"Boy Blue" (Live at Le Zénith) — 5:36

Notes
"Maybe He'll Know" remix by Phil Thornalley and "What's Going On" club mix by Shep Pettibone.

Credits
Producer – Cyndi Lauper
Co-producer – Lennie Petze
Remix producer – Shep Pettibone
Remix producer – Phil Thornalley
Mixed By – Gary Lyons
Photography By – Annie Leibovitz

Charts

Weekly charts

Year-end charts

References

Cyndi Lauper songs
1988 singles
1988 songs
Epic Records singles